Eduardo "Pollo" Cortes (born 31 August 1993) is a Mexican footballer who currently plays as a goalkeeper for the Mesquite Outlaws in the Major Arena Soccer League.

Career

Youth & College
Cortes played with the FC Dallas academy for three seasons, before going to play college soccer at Indiana University – Purdue University Indianapolis in 2012. At IUPUI, Cortes made 61 appearances for the Jags.

While at college, Cortes appeared for National Premier Soccer League side Indy Eleven NPSL in 2014.

Professional
Cortes joined United Soccer League side Saint Louis FC in March 2016, where he stayed for the entire season, but was released without making an appearance for the club.

On September 15, 2017, Cortes joined MLS side FC Dallas as their third-choice goalkeeper.

Cortes played with amateur side NTX Rayados in 2018, and National Premier Soccer League side Fort Worth Vaqueros in 2019, before signing with USL League One's North Texas SC, an affiliate of FC Dallas.

Cortes was named to the Major Arena Soccer League's 2019–2020 All-Rookie Team for his performance with the Mesquite Outlaws.

References

External links
 Profile at IUPUI Athletics

1993 births
Living people
Mexican footballers
Association football goalkeepers
IUPUI Jaguars men's soccer players
Saint Louis FC players
FC Dallas players
North Texas SC players
Soccer players from Dallas
National Premier Soccer League players
USL League One players
People from Zapopan, Jalisco
Major Arena Soccer League players
St. Louis Ambush (2013–) players
San Diego Sockers players